The revived fifth season of the food reality television series, Man v. Food, premiered on the Travel Channel August 7, 2017, at 9:00 p.m. Eastern Time with back-to-back half-hour episodes in New York City and Milwaukee. New host, actor and food enthusiast Casey Webb, took over where former host Adam Richman left off by visiting unique eateries in different cities in a quest to find the ultimate eats before he took on their local eating challenges.

The fifth-season tally wound up at 5 wins for Man and 5 wins for Food.

Episodes

References

External links
 Man v. Food official website

2017 American television seasons
Man v. Food